Albert Ramón Ramírez Durán (born 7 May 1992), known as Albert Ramírez, is a Venezuelan professional boxer. As an amateur he competed in the light heavyweight division at the 2016 Summer Olympics.

Professional boxing record

Notes

References

External links
 
 
 
 

1992 births
Living people
Venezuelan male boxers
Olympic boxers of Venezuela
Boxers at the 2016 Summer Olympics
Pan American Games medalists in boxing
Pan American Games silver medalists for Venezuela
Boxers at the 2015 Pan American Games
Light-heavyweight boxers
Medalists at the 2015 Pan American Games
People from Mérida (state)
20th-century Venezuelan people
21st-century Venezuelan people